Colegio O'Farrill is a private school in 	Col. Ampliación Miguel Hidalgo, Tlalpan, Mexico City. It serves early childhood through senior high school (preparatoria).

It was established as the Colegio Irlandés O´Farrill by Martha Ventosa O'Farrill.

References

External links
  

High schools in Mexico City
Tlalpan